The Tai Le script (ᥖᥭᥰ ᥘᥫᥴ), or Dehong Dai script, is a Brahmic script used to write the Tai Nüa language spoken by the Tai Nua people of south-central Yunnan, China. (The language is also known as Nɯa, Dehong Dai and Chinese Shan.) It is written in horizontal lines from left to right, with spaces only between clauses and sentences.

The Tai Le script has a long history (700–800 years) and has used several different orthographic conventions.

Traditional script 
The traditional Tai Le script, known as Lik Tho Ngok ("bean sprout script") by the Tai Nua, is a Brahmic script that is found in the Dehong Dai and Jingpo Autonomous Prefecture of Yunnan, China.

Names 
The Lik Tho Ngok script is known by a variety of names, including the Old Tay or Old Dai script, Lik Tay La/Na ("Northern Tay script") and Lik To Yao ("long script").

History 
The Lik Tho Ngok script used by the Tai Nuea people is one of a number of "Lik Tai" scripts or "Lik" scripts used by various Tai peoples in northeastern India, northern Myanmar, southwestern Yunnan, and northwestern Laos. Evidence suggests that the Lik scripts have a common origin from an Old Burmese or Mon script prototype before the fifteenth century, most probably in the polity of Mong Mao. The Lik Tai script featured on a 1407 Ming dynasty scroll exhibits many features of the Burmese script, including fourteen of the nineteen consonants, three medial diacritics and the high tone marker. According to the scholar Daniels, this shows that the Tai borrowed from the Burmese script to create their own script; the Lik Tai script was derived from the Burmese script, as it could only have been created by someone proficient in Burmese. Daniels also argues that, unlike previously thought, the Lik Tho Ngok script is not the origin of the other Lik Tai scripts, as the 1407 Lik Tai script shows greater similarity to the Ahom script, which has been attested earlier than the Lik Tho Ngok script. Other "Lik" scripts are used for the Khamti, Phake, Aiton and Ahom languages, as well as for other Tai languages across Northern Myanmar and Assam, in Northeast India. The Lik scripts have a limited inventory of 16 to 18 consonant symbols compared to the Tai Tham script, which possibly indicates that the scripts were not developed for writing Pali.

It is unknown when, where and how the Lik Tho Ngok script first emerged, and it has only been attested after the 18th century. Broadly speaking, only Lik Tho Ngok and Lik To Mon ('round' or 'circular' script), used in Shan State, are still in use today. Government-led reforms of the main Tai Nuea traditional scripts began in Dehong the 1950s. Between 1952 and 1988 the Dehong script went through four reforms, initially adding a consonant, vowel symbols and tone markers, then in 1956 changing many graphemes and tone markers. A third reform was proposed in 1964, again adding and changing graphemes and making further changes to tone markers, and a fourth reform took place in 1988.

Characteristics 
In common with other Lik orthographies, Lik Tho Ngok is an alphasyllabary, but not fully an abugida, since occurrence of an inherent vowel is restricted to medial position, where it may take either /-a-/ or /-aa-/.

In Mueng Sing today, the smaller glyphs are not used and two main styles of Lik Tho Ngok are recognised by local scribes: To Lem ( ‘edged letters,’) which have straighter edges and more pointed angles, and To Mon ( ‘rounded letters’) without sharp angles. There are 21 initial consonant graphemes in the Lik Tho Ngok script used in Mueang Sing, representing 15 phonemes in the spoken dialect plus two rarer phonemes (/d/ and /b/).

Variants and usage 
The script used by the Tai Dehong and Tai Mao has consonant and vowel glyphs similar to the reformed Tai Le script, while the script used by the Tai Nuea differs somewhat from the other scripts. However, the scripts used by the Tai Nuea, Tai Dehong and Tai Mao are all considered Lik Tho Ngok.

In Muang Sing, Laos, the Lik Tho Ngok script is used for secular purposes, while the Tham script is used for Buddhist manuscripts. In Yunnan, China, Lik Tho Ngok is still used in the Jinggu Dai and Yi Autonomous County, the Menglian Dai, Lahu and Va Autonomous County, and the Gengma Dai and Va Autonomous County. Lik Tho Ngok and the reformed Tai Le script are used in the Dehong Dai and Jingpo Autonomous Prefecture, as well as Lik To Mon and the reformed Shan script (in areas near the Myanmar border). Tai Nuea areas that use the reformed Tai Le script have seen a decline in the knowledge and use of the traditional script, but recently there has been renewed interest in the traditional script and manuscript tradition.

The manuscript culture of the Tai Nuea people is maintained by small numbers of specialised scribes who are literate in the Lik Tho Ngok script, used for secular purposes and only in manuscripts. The script is not taught in temples, in favor of the Tai Tham script. The local government’s "Intangible Cultural Heritage Protection Center" is working to obtain and protect manuscripts written in the Dai traditional scripts, as of 2013.

Reformed script 
Today the reformed Tai Le orthography, which removes ambiguity in reading and adds tone markers, is widely used by the Tai Dehong and Tai Mao in the Dehong Dai and Jingpo Autonomous Prefecture, but not in Tai Nuea communities in the Jinggu Dai and Yi Autonomous County, the Menglian Dai, Lahu and Va Autonomous County, and the Gengma Dai and Va Autonomous County, where only the traditional scripts are used. Because of differing letters and orthographic rules, the traditional Tai Nuea and reformed Tai Le scripts are mutually unintelligible without considerable effort.

Between 1952 and 1988, the script went through four reforms. The third reform (1963/1964) used diacritics to represent tones, while the fourth reform (1988–present) uses standalone tone letters.

Letters 
In modern Tai Le orthographies, initial consonants precede vowels, vowels precede final consonants and tone marks, if present, follow the entire syllable. Consonants have an inherent vowel /a/, unless followed by a dependent vowel sign. When vowels occur initially in a word or syllable, they are preceded by the vowel carrier ᥟ.

Note that old orthography tone diacritics combine with short letters (as in /ka²/ ) but appear to the right of tall letters (as in /ki²/ ).

Numbers 
There are differences between the numbers employed by the Tai Le script in China and Myanmar. The Chinese Tai Le numbers are similar to Chinese Shan and Burmese numbers. Burmese Tai Le numbers are similar to Burmese Shan numbers.

Unicode 

The Tai Le script was added to the Unicode Standard in April 2003 with the release of version 4.0.

The Unicode block for Tai Le is U+1950–U+197F:

The tone diacritics used in the old orthography (specifically the third reform) are located in the Combining Diacritical Marks Unicode block:

See also 
 The New Tai Lue alphabet for the Tai Lü language, derived from the Old Tai Lue script "Dai Tam"; which is an abugida

References

Sources

External links 
 Omniglot, Dehong Dai script

Brahmic scripts